Phong Vân may refer to several places in Vietnam, including:

, a rural commune of Ba Vì District
Phong Vân, Bắc Giang, a rural commune of Lục Ngạn District